Frank Fairchild Wesbrook (July 12, 1868 – October 20, 1918) was a Canadian physician, bacteriologist, academic, and University president. He was the first president of the University of British Columbia.

Biography
Born in Oakland, Ontario, Wesbrook received a bachelor's and master's degree from the University of Manitoba in 1887 and 1888. He received his M.D. and C.M. degrees from the University of Manitoba and McGill College. From 1891 to 1893, he was a Professor of Pathology at the University of Manitoba. From 1893 to 1895, he studied pathology at Cambridge University.

In 1895, he was appointed director of the Department of Pathology, Bacteriology and Hygiene at the University of Minnesota. His chief work was in Bacteriology relating to public health. He helped in diphtheria research and was in favor of chlorine sterilization of water. He was also a Director of the Minnesota Board of Health Laboratories and was a member of the Minnesota State Board of Health.

In 1906, he was appointed Dean of the University of Minnesota Medical School. In 1913, he was appointed the first president of the University of British Columbia. He served until his death in 1918.

References

External links
 
 

1868 births
1918 deaths
Canadian microbiologists
Presidents of the University of British Columbia
People from the County of Brant
University of Manitoba alumni
University of Minnesota faculty